Willy Eras Sánchez (born 10 September 1980) is a Costa Rican professional footballer who currently plays for Municipal Liberia.

Club career
Eras started his career at Liberia Mia, winning promotion with them to the top level Premier Division and clinching the 2009 winter title. He later played for Barrio México, Puntarenas and Herediano.

In February 2013, Eras returned to then second division side Municipal Liberia.

International career
Eras has made two appearances for the Costa Rica national football team, his debut coming in a friendly against Peru on August 22, 2007 and his final international was on 12 September 2007 against Canada.

References

External links
 
 Profile at Nacion 

1980 births
Living people
Association football midfielders
Costa Rican men's footballers
Costa Rica international footballers
Municipal Liberia footballers
Puntarenas F.C. players
C.S. Herediano footballers